This is a list of governors of Västerbotten County in Sweden, from 1598–present. This list is incomplete.

Governors of Österbotten and Västerbotten from 1598–1631
Theodoricus Petri Ruuta 1598–1599
Stellan Otto Mörner −1643
Ernst (Erensgisle) Larsson Creutz (−1635) 1631

Governors of Västerbotten from 1638–present
Stellan Otto von Mörner 1638–1641
Frans Crusebjörn 1641–1653
Johan Graan (−1679) 1653–1679
Lorentz Creutz (1646–1698) 1675
Jacob Fleming 1679
Hans Clerk 1680–1683
Hans Abraham Kruuse af Verchou 1683–1688
Reinhold Johan von Fersen (1646–1716) 1688–
Arvid Horn 1692
Gustaf Douglas 1692–1705
Otto Wilhelm Löwen (1659–1712) 1705–1712 
Anders Erik Ramsay (1646–1734) 1713–1717 
Magnus Fredrik Cronberg (1668–1740) 1717–1719
Otto Reinhold Strömfelt (1679–1746) 1719
Jacob Grundell (1657–1757) 1719–1733
Gabriel Gabrielsson Gyllengrip (1687–1753) 1733–1753
Olof Leijonstedt 1755–1759
Johan Funck 1759–1762
Martin Ehrensvan 1762–1765
Olof Malmerfelt 1765–1769
Carl Efraim Carpelan
Magnus Adolf von Kothen 1769–1775
Georg Gustaf Wrangel 1775–1781
Carl Wilhelm Leijonstedt 1781–1782
Fredrik von Stenhagen 1782–1789
Johan Gustaf af Donner 1789–1795
Pehr Adam Stromberg 1795–1811
Gustaf Edelstam 1811–1817
Georg Lars af Schmidt 1817–1842
Gustaf Adolf Montgomery 1842–1856
Gustaf Munthe 1856–1864
Erik Viktor Almquist 1864–1872
Axel Wästfelt 1873–1891
Jesper Ingevald Crusebjörn (1843–1904) 1891–1904 
Axel Asker (1848–1924)  t. f. 1900–1902 
Axel Fredrik Oscar Cederberg (1837–1913)  t. f. 1902–1903 
Henning Theodor Biörklund (1849–1937) 1904–1916 
Axel Schotte (1860–1923) 1916–1923 
Robert Hagen (1868–1922) t. f. 1917–1918 
 Nils Gustaf Ringstrand (1863–1935) t. f. 1918–1919 1923–1931 
Gustav Rosén (1876–1942) 1931–1942 
Elof Lindberg (1891–1956) 1943–1956 
Filip Kristensson (1898–1980) 1957–1965 
Karl G. Samuelsson (1911–1993) 1965–1971 
Bengt Lyberg (1912–1995) 1971–1978 
Sven Johansson (1928–2023) 1978–1991 
Görel Bohlin (1930–) 1992–1995 
Georg Andersson (1936–) 1995–2001 
Lorentz Andersson (1942–) 2001–2007
Chris Heister (1950–) 2008–2012
Magdalena Andersson (1954–) 2012–2020
Helene Hellmark Knutsson (1969–) 2020–2026

Footnotes

References

Vasterbotten